Zoni is a village located in the Tsotyli municipal unit, situated in Kozani regional unit, in the Greek region of Macedonia. The town of Kozani is 83 kilometers to the east.

Zoni's elevation is 1,050 meters above sea level. The postal code is 50002, while the telephone code is +30 24680. At the 2011 census, the population was 63.

References

Populated places in Kozani (regional unit)